The Uruguay women's national beach handball team is the national team of Uruguay. It is governed by the Uruguay Handball Federation and takes part in international beach handball competitions.

World Championships results

Other Competitions
2019 South and Central American Beach Handball Championship - 4th place
2022 South and Central American Beach Handball Championship -

Youth team results
2022 Youth Beach Handball World Championship - 13th
2022 South and Central American Youth Beach Handball Championship - 
2022 South American Youth Games -

References

External links
Official website
IHF profile 

Beach handball
Women's national beach handball teams